Parkland is a suburban city, 42  miles northwest of Miami, in northern Broward County, Florida, United States. As of the 2020 census, the population of Parkland was 34,670. Parkland is part of the Miami metropolitan area, which was home to 6,166,488 people in 2020.

Parkland's zoning laws are designed to protect the "park-like" character of the city. There were no stores or traffic lights in Parkland until the mid-1990s and early 2000s when large neighborhood developments (Heron Bay and Parkland Isles) were built.

History 
Parkland was incorporated as a city on August 13, 1963, by C. Farris Bryant, the Governor of Florida. 

On February 14, 2018, Marjory Stoneman Douglas High School, a High School in Parkland, became the scene of a deadly mass shooting perpetrated by a 19-year-old former student of the school. It was the fifth deadliest high school shooting in United States history.

Geography 

The northern boundary of Parkland coincides with the border between Broward and Palm Beach counties. West Boca Raton, an unincorporated area of Palm Beach County that extends west of Boca Raton's city limits, lies to the north. Coconut Creek lies to the east, Coral Springs lies to the south and the west is bounded by the Everglades.

Demographics

2020 census 

As of the 2020 United States census, there were 34,670 people, 9,752 households, and 8,472 families residing in the city.

2010 census 

As of 2010, there were 8,292 households, out of which 7.4% were vacant. In 2000, the city population was spread out, with 35.1% under the age of 18, 4.3% from 18 to 24, 32.8% from 25 to 44, 24.0% from 45 to 64, and 3.8% who were 65 years of age or older. The median age was 36 years. For every 100 females, there were 99.0 males. For every 100 females age 18 and over, there were 93.7 males.

According to a 2016 estimate, the median income for a household in the city was $131,340, and the estimated median house value was $596,212. Males had a median income of $103,942 versus $81,425 for females. The per capita income for the city was $56,793. About 2.0% of families and .4% of the population were below the poverty line, including 3.2% of those under age 18 and none of those age 65 or over.

As of 2000, 82.79% of inhabitants spoke English at home, while 11.48% spoke Spanish, of 2.03% spoke Italian, and 1.20% spoke German.

Politics 
Parkland elects a five-member City Commission. Elections are non-partisan, however, all current members are party-affiliated (4 Democrats and 1 Republican).

Education 

Broward County Public Schools operates public schools in Parkland.

Public high school
 Marjory Stoneman Douglas High School serves almost all of the city limits, while small sections are zoned to Coral Springs High School

In addition the community is in the service area of the magnet school Pompano Beach High School.

Public middle school
 Westglades Middle School in Parkland serves almost all of the city limits, while small sections are zoned to Forest Glen Middle School in Coral Springs.

Public elementary schools
 Riverglades Elementary School
 Park Trails Elementary School
 Heron Heights Elementary School
Portions are zoned to Coral Park and Park Springs elementaries in Coral Springs.

Private primary schools
 Mary Help of Christians School (of the Roman Catholic Archdiocese of Miami)

Notable people 

 Caesar Bacarella, race car driver
 X González, political activist who organized protests in response to the 2018 shooting at Stoneman Douglas High School
 Roberto Luongo, former NHL goalie for the Florida Panthers, has lived in Parkland since 2000
 Andrew Peeke, professional ice hockey player
 Anthony Rizzo, professional baseball player for the  New York Yankees
XXXTentacion, rapper and singer, lived in Parkland from 2017 until his death
 Jon Weiner, ESPN radio host
 George Poveromo,  Renowned saltwater angler and host of World of Saltwater Fishing on the Discovery Channel.

References

External links 

 Official website

Cities in Broward County, Florida
Cities in Florida
Populated places established in 1963
1963 establishments in Florida